Urodexiomima is a genus of parasitic flies in the family Tachinidae.

Species
Urodexiomima uramyoides Townsend, 1927

References

Dexiinae
Taxa named by Charles Henry Tyler Townsend
Diptera of Asia
Tachinidae genera